Jiří Douba (born 23 May 1958) is a Czech fencer. He competed in the individual and team épée events at the 1980 and 1992 Summer Olympics. Jiří Douba was an agent of the Czech secret police StB.

References

1958 births
Living people
Czech male fencers
Czechoslovak male fencers
Olympic fencers of Czechoslovakia
Fencers at the 1980 Summer Olympics
Fencers at the 1992 Summer Olympics
Sportspeople from Karlovy Vary